In enzymology, an orcinol 2-monooxygenase is an enzyme that catalyzes the chemical reaction

orcinol + NADH + H+ + O2  2,3,5-trihydroxytoluene + NAD+ + H2O

The 4 substrates of this enzyme are orcinol, NADH, H+, and O2, whereas its 3 products are 2,3,5-trihydroxytoluene, NAD+, and H2O.

This enzyme belongs to the family of oxidoreductases, specifically those acting on paired donors, with O2 as oxidant and incorporation or reduction of oxygen. The oxygen incorporated need not be derived from O2 with NADH or NADPH as one donor, and incorporation of one atom o oxygen into the other donor.  The systematic name of this enzyme class is orcinol,NADH:oxygen oxidoreductase (2-hydroxylating). This enzyme is also called orcinol hydroxylase.  It employs one cofactor, FAD.

References

 

EC 1.14.13
NADPH-dependent enzymes
NADH-dependent enzymes
Flavoproteins
Enzymes of unknown structure